Son of Scarlat Callimachi, Alexandru Callimachi or Alexandros Kallimachis fled Moldavia with his mother and other members of his family in 1821, at the time of his father's death. The family sought refuge in Russia, where Alexander finished his studies, at the University of Kyiv. After traveling through Europe, he made his way to the Ottoman Empire in 1829, where his family possessions and titles were restored to him. 

He entered the service of the Ottoman administration, first serving as attache and later as counselor to Rashid Pasha, the Ottoman ambassador to Paris at the time. 

In 1848 he was appointed Minister Plenipotentiary to London, and then, a year later, to Paris under the same title. In 1850 he was appointed Prince of Samos, a position which he never accepted personally, choosing rather to administer the island through the offices of a delegate, Georgios Konemenos. Though his rule was resisted by some of the islanders, he is known for having founded the constitutional political system of the Principality. That consisted of the separation of the divided the legislative, executive and judicial powers. He also advanced the educational system, establishing four Greek schools and twenty two elementary schools, and also established a system of courts as well as a printing house.

In 1853 he retired to Versailles but was recalled in 1855 was appointed ambassador to Vienna, a position which he was only able to assume after having played an important part in the Istanbul conferences on the re-organization of the Danubian principalities. 

For his services, in June 1861, Kallimachis was granted the Ottoman title of Bala, the first Christian to have been conferred that honor.

Sources
Nita Dan Danielescu. "Gavriil Callimachi, ctitorul Catedralei mitropolitane Sf. Gheorghe din Iasi" Ziarul Lumina, 2006-02-20
Thompson Cooper. Men of the Time: A Dictionary of Contemporaries. p. 201; G. Routledge and sons, London, New York, 1875
The History of Samos 

Princes of Samos
19th-century Romanian people
People from the Ottoman Empire of Romanian descent
Ambassadors of the Ottoman Empire to Austria
Alexandros
Year of death missing
Year of birth missing
19th-century rulers in Europe
19th-century Greek people